Jan Zimmermann (born 19 April 1985 in Offenbach am Main) is a retired German goalkeeper. After retirement from his playing career in 2020, he is currently the goalkeeping coach for Bundesliga side Eintracht Frankfurt.

Career
Born and raised in Hesse, Zimmermann started his professional career at Eintracht Frankfurt for the reserve team, competing in the Oberliga, the fourth German tier.  After absolving his youth academy time, Zimmermann earned a professional contract for the 2004–05 season and had five Bundesliga appearances as third choice goalkeeper. In 2011, he moved to SV Darmstadt 98.

On 13 May 2014, he signed a two-year contract with 1. FC Heidenheim.

Career statistics

Honours

Club
Eintracht Frankfurt
 DFB-Pokal: 2017-18
SV Darmstadt 98
Third-placed
 3. Liga: 2013–14

References

Perfekt: 1860 holt Keeper Zimmermann, tz.de, 23 June 2016

External links
 
 
 

1985 births
Association football goalkeepers
Living people
German footballers
Eintracht Frankfurt players
Eintracht Frankfurt II players
SV Darmstadt 98 players
1. FC Heidenheim players
TSV 1860 Munich players
Bundesliga players
3. Liga players
2. Bundesliga players
Sportspeople from Offenbach am Main
Footballers from Hesse